Rejas de San Esteban or Rejas is a village in Soria, Spain. It is part of the municipality of San Esteban de Gormaz. The village had 153 inhabitants in 1981.

References

Soria